"Like Red on a Rose" is a song written by Robert Lee Castleman and Melanie Castleman, and recorded by American country music singer Alan Jackson. It was released in July 2006 as the first single and title track from Jackson's album Like Red on a Rose.

Critical reception
Alison Krauss, who produced the album, told Billboard that the song was "so positive and loving, yet it has a real dark melody."

The song was nominated for a Grammy Award for Best Country Song at the 2006 Grammy Awards.

Chart performance
"Like Red on a Rose" debuted  at number 42 on the U.S. Billboard Hot Country Songs charts dated for the week ending July 29, 2006. It spent twenty weeks on that chart and peaked at number 15.

References

2006 singles
2006 songs
Alan Jackson songs
Arista Nashville singles
Songs written by Robert Lee Castleman